The Nova Southeastern University College of Dental Medicine is the dental school of Nova Southeastern University. It is located in Fort Lauderdale, Florida, United States. When it opened in 1997, it was the first new dental school to open in the United States in 24 years. It is the largest dental school in Florida. The school is accredited by the American Dental Association.

Academics
In recent years, it has received more applications for admittance than any other dental school in the United States. There are approximately 3,500 applicants for the entering class size of 110. Entering first year students averaged in the 95th percentile nationally on the Dental Admission Test. It offers a four-year D.M.D. program, along with postdoctoral programs in: Advanced Education in General Dentistry (AEGD), Endodontics, Orthodontics, Pedodontics (Pediatric Dentistry), Periodontology, Prosthodontics, Oral and Maxillofacial Surgery (four years program), and Master of Science in Craniofacial Research.

Research
The NSU College of Dental Medicine is currently involved in Biomaterials development and research in Oral Biology. Some of the research being conducted:

Biomaterials Development

Microtensile fracture strength testing
Profilometer fracture mode testing
Fatigue, thermocycling and load testing
Scanning electron microscope evaluation
Leakage testing
Hybrid layer evaluation
Remineralization and demineralization studies
ColorEye and Gloss analysis

Clinical Testing

Whitening kits
Restorative materials
Endodontic materials
Periodontal therapies
Prosthodontic devices
Toothpaste
Mouthwash
Adhesives
Disinfectants
Analgesics
Drugs
Lasers
Dental instruments and devices
Toothbrushes (manual or power)
Ortho appliances/devices
Dental floss

Toothbrushing
Dentifrice testing
Abrasion testing
Wear testing
Clinical testing

Biocompatibility Testing
Drugs and biomaterials
In vitro cytotoxicity
In vivo biocompatibility
Histological assessment

Molecular Assays
Protein/Gene activation
PCR
Gene silencing
Gene isolation
Molecular pathway elucidation

Pulp Biology

For over 50 years, from the 1950s until his death in 2002, oral pathologist Harold Stanley DDS, MS collected extracted teeth from across the world. Recently the histological archive was located at Nova Southeastern College of Dental Medicine. It is reportedly the largest and most compete histological archive in the world containing over 200,000 specimens and weighing more than 3 tons of teeth!

Dr. Stanley can be credited with establishing Oral Biology as the science we know today, prior to his efforts, the practice of dentistry and treatment planning had little regard for the biology of the oral tissues.

Dr. Stanley specialized in the soft tissue in the core of teeth called 'pulp'. The pulp is responsible for creating tooth dentin and for maintaining the vitality of the tooth throughout life. It is also responsible for the pain experienced if the tooth is diseased or damaged, and also for hot and cold sensitivity.

Dr. Stanley studied pulp death and regeneration. The photograph opposite shows the ability of the pulp cells to mineralize more tooth substance in response to injury. The purpose of the increased mineralization is to protect the pulp tissue from disease, injury and trauma. Dr. Stanley also showed that the bacterial invasion of teeth could destroy the cells and cause a loss of tooth vitality. The invasion of tooth dentinal tubules by bacteria can be seen in the photograph opposite. The bacteria is present in the mouth saliva. If bacteria reaches the pulp it can cause severe inflammation called 'pulpitis'. The pulpitis is normally painful and will require endodontic treatment. This involves the removal of the pulp and the cleaning and shaping of the root canals. The faculty and staff of Nova Southeastern are preparing the extensive histological archive of Dr. Stanley for on-line use. This will enable anyone to access his archive of teeth from anywhere in the world.

Stem Cells

Stem cells have the ability to continuously divide and differentiate (develop) into various other kinds of cells/tissues. All tissues originate from fetal stem cells. Recently adult stem cells have been identified with the ability to create new tissues. We investigate stem cells that are taken from donor adult tissues, we do not conduct any research using fetal stem cells. Tissue engineering is the creation of new replacement tissues Potential patients that could benefit from stem cell therapies (millions):
Cardiovascular disease 58
Autoimmune diseases 30
Diabetes 16
Osteoporosis 10
Cancer 8.2
Alzheimer's disease 4.5
Parkinson's disease 1.5
Severe burns 0.3
Spinal cord injuries 0.25
Birth defects 0.15

Potential Therapies

Stem cells will be used as part of tissue engineering to create new tissues to replace diseased, missing and lost tissues:
Disabled
Accidents
Cleft Palate
Diabetes

Tissue Engineering

Tissue engineering is the creation of new tissues in the laboratory using stem cells, bioactive molecules and scaffolds. How we will use stem cells therapeutically:
1.Isolate stem cells from blood transfusion or cell culture (flow cytometer)
2.Proliferate the cells in culture using growth factors
3. Grow the cells around scaffold materials
4.Create organ culture conditions for a specific cell and tissue type
5.Transplant the new replacement tissues into patients

Elderly Oral Health

The incidence of diseases, and oral problems in the elderly requiring dental treatment is uncertain. In this study, the oral health of 265 South Florida nursing home residents aged between 45 and 98 years was assessed. The levels of tooth loss, oral hygiene scores, oral status, and the status of existing dentures are summarized.

See also

American Student Dental Association

References

External links
Official Web site
Research

Nova Southeastern University
Educational institutions established in 1997
Dental schools in Florida
1997 establishments in Florida